"Let the Feeling Flow" is a song by American recording artist Peabo Bryson. The song was released in 1981 as the lead single in support of his album, I Am Love. The song was a top ten R&B hit, peaking at number six on Billboard's Hot Black Singles, and forty-two on the Hot Pop Singles chart.

Charts

References

External links
[ Allmusic Peabo Bryson]
Peabo Bryson at Wenig-LaMonica Associates
Peabo Bryson Fan Page

1981 songs
Peabo Bryson songs
Songs written by Peabo Bryson
1981 singles
Capitol Records singles